The Sacramento sucker (Catostomus occidentalis) is a species of ray-finned fish in the family Catostomidae. It is primarily found in California with some populations extending into Oregon and Nevada. They inhabit a diverse range of habitats from headwater streams to deep lakes to estuaries.

Relationship with humans

The Sacramento sucker was an important food fish for the Native Americans of California. In particular the Achomawi band of the Pit River relied on the Sacramento sucker, particularly after salmon began disappearing from the river in the 1860s due to pollution from lumber mills and the eventual construction of hydroelectric dams. Sacramento suckers provided an important part of the Achomawi's diet up until the 1950s and the remains of stone traps used to catch the fish in midwinter can still be found in the river. The International Game Fish Association all tackle world record stands at  taken from the Stanislaus River near Escalon, California.

References

Catostomus